Adolphe Pierre Leleux (15 November 1812, in Paris – 27 July 1891) was a French painter and illustrator. His brother Armand Leleux was also a painter.

Biography

Adolphe Pierre Leleux was self-taught and exhibited work at the Paris Salon from 1835 onwards. Although he decided to concentrate on painting after 1837, he did study engraving in the studio of Alexandre Vincent Sixdeniers. It was in 1838 that he discovered Brittany and painted many genre paintings inspired by the Breton countryside. He was given the nickname "Leleux le Breton".

Other works
 "Bedouins attaques par des chiefs".  This 1850 painting is held in Lyon's Musée des beaux-arts. It was exhibited at the Paris Salon of 1850.
 "Bucherons Bretons". This 1845 work is held in Chantilly's Musée Condé.
 "Depiquage des Bles en Algerie". This 1853 painting, one of many executed by Leleux whilst in Algeria, is held in Lille's Musée des beaux-arts. It was shown at the Paris Salon (Salon des artistes français) of 1853.
 "Edmond Hedouin".  A portrait of 1880. Held in Versailles' Musée national des châteaux de Versailles et de Trianon.
 "Le Mot d'Ordre.24 Fevrier.1848". A painting dating to 1848 which is held in Versailles' Musée national des châteaux de Versailles et de Trianon.

References

1812 births
1891 deaths
19th-century French painters
French male painters
Breton art
19th-century French male artists